The following is a list of Australian Open champions in tennis:

Champions

Senior

Wheelchair

Junior

‡ Player won both the junior and senior title.
† Player won the junior title and reached the senior final.

See also
Lists of champions of specific events
List of Australian Open men's singles champions
List of Australian Open women's singles champions
List of Australian Open men's doubles champions
List of Australian Open women's doubles champions
List of Australian Open mixed doubles champions

Other Grand Slam tournament champions
List of French Open champions
List of Wimbledon champions
List of US Open champions

Notes

References